The Gibraltar Study Circle is a global non-profit society based in the United Kingdom, founded by Walter (Wally) Jackson in 1975.  Its aim is to expand the knowledge of the philately of Gibraltar, a British overseas territory located at the entrance to the Mediterranean Sea overlooking the Strait of Gibraltar.  The study circle looks at the philately of Gibraltar in all its forms for the benefit of collectors (philatelists) from all walks of life. This includes studying the postal history, postage stamps, revenue stamps, postal stationery and associated overprints from Gibraltar and any of these used in Morocco.  Any new information is shared with the membership via its quarterly journal, "The Rock", which has been published since 1975, showing articles of interest not only to philatelists but also historians, artists and sociologists.

The society has bi-annual meetings over a long weekend, mostly in the UK but sometimes in Gibraltar.  The Spring meeting is generally held for the Annual General Meeting whilst the other is held in the Autumn for the annual competition, at which displays of a wide variety of philately related material are shown - not just stamps, but any historical or artistic artefacts with a (sometimes tenuous) link to Gibraltar philately.

The Study Circle welcomes members from all corners of the globe, whatever your level of expertise or area of interest.

The circle is not to be confused with the Gibraltar Philatelic Society which is based in Gibraltar itself.

Selected Study Circle publications 
The following books have been published by the Gibraltar Study Circle.  Some of these are still available, others are only available via the GSC Library.

 British Post Offices and Agencies in Morocco 1857 – 1898 by Dr Kenneth Clough
 British Post Offices and Agencies in Morocco 1857 – 1907 and Local Posts 1891 – 1914  by Dr Kenneth Clough
 Gibraltar: Collecting King George VI  by Edmund Chambers, 2003 
 Gibraltar: Embroidered Silk Postcards – 2nd Edition  by Eric D Holmes, 2013
 Gibraltar: Errors, Flaws & Varieties 1886-2008  by R.G.W. Burton, 2008
 Gibraltar: The Link with the Sea by Sam Smith, 1997
 Gibraltar:  New Constitution Double Overprint  by Edmund Chambers, 2012
 Gibraltar Postal Stationery 2nd Edition  by Wally Jackson, updated in 2006 by Eric Holmes & Robert Neville
 Gibraltar: The Postal History & Postage Stamps Vol.1 to 1885  by Geoffrey Osborn, 1995
 Gibraltar: Quarantine and Disinfection of Mail  by Garcia/Vandervelde
 Gibraltar First Day Covers by R.H. Neville, 1984.
 Gibraltar: The postal history and postage stamps. Volume 4 - Gibraltar Postal Stationery by Eric D. Holmes & Robert H. Neville, second edition, 2013.

See also 
Postage stamps and postal history of Gibraltar
British post offices in Morocco
Postage stamps and postal history of Gibraltar

References

External links 
Gibraltar Study Circle
Gibraltar Philatelic Bureau

Philatelic organisations based in the United Kingdom
Philately of Gibraltar
1975 establishments in Gibraltar
Organizations established in 1975